Athletes from the Netherlands competed at the 1956 Winter Olympics in Cortina d'Ampezzo, Italy.

Figure skating

Speed skating

Men

References
Official Olympic Reports
International Olympic Committee results database
Olympic Winter Games 1956, full results by sports-reference.com

Nations at the 1956 Winter Olympics
1956
Winter Olympic